Neea is a genus of plants in family Nyctaginaceae from the Caribbean region, Central and South America. Members of the genus are commonly called Nia, Neea, or saltwood. 

The genus was named by botanists José Pavón and Hipólito Ruiz in honor of Luis Née, a botanist on the Malaspina Expedition.
It was first described and published in Fl. Peruv. Prodr. on page 52 in 1794.

It is native to Belize, Bolivia, Brazil, Colombia, Costa Rica, Cuba, Dominican Republic, Ecuador, El Salvador, French Guiana, Guatemala, Guyana, Haiti, Honduras, Jamaica, Leeward Is., Mexico, Nicaragua, Panamá, Paraguay, Peru, Puerto Rico, the southwest Caribbean, Suriname, Venezuela and Venezuelan Antilles.

Selected species
It contains the following species (but this list may be incomplete):
 Neea acuminatissima, Standl.  see Neea amplifolia
 Neea amaruayensis, Steyerm
 Neea amplexicaulis, Dwyer & M.V. Hayden
 Neea amplifolia, Donn. Sm.
 Neea anisophylla, Ernst
 Neea bangii, Rusby
 Neea belizensis, Lundell      see Neea psychotrioides
 Neea bernardii, Steyerm.
 Neea bracteosa, Steyerm.
 Neea brevipedunculata, Steyerm.
 Neea brittonii, Standl.
 Neea buxifolia, (Hook. f.) Heimerl is an unresolved name
 Neea cauliflora, Heimerl     see Neea floribunda
 Neea cedenensis, Steyerm.
 Neea choriophylla, Standl.   see Neea psychotrioides
 Neea clarkii, Steyerm.
 Neea darienensis, Dwyer & M.V. Hayden
 Neea davidsei, Steyerm.
 Neea delicatula, Standl.
 Neea divaricata, Poepp. & Endl.
 Neea ekmanii, Heimerl is an unresolved name
 Neea elegans, Dwyer & S.M. Hayden   see Neea amplifolia
 Neea elegans, P.H. Allen   see Neea amplifolia
 Neea floribunda, Poepp. & Endl.
 Neea gentlei, Lundell   see Neea psychotrioides
 Neea grandis, Maguire & Steyerm.
 Neea guaiquinimae, Steyerm.
 Neea guatemalensis, Lundell   see Neea amplifolia
 Neea hermaphrodita, S. Moore
 Neea hirsuta, Poepp. & Endl.
 Neea huachamacarae, Steyerm.
 Neea ignicola, Steyerm.
 Neea laetevirens, Standl.
 Neea laxa, Poepp. & Endl.
 Neea liesneri, Steyerm.
 Neea macrophylla, Britton ex Rusby   see Neea brittonii
 Neea macrophylla, Poepp. & Endl.
 Neea mapourioides, Steyerm.
 Neea marahuacae, Steyerm.
 Neea neblinensis, Maguire & Steyerm.
 Neea obovata, Spruce ex Heimerl
 Neea oppositifolia, Ruíz & Pavón
 Neea orosiana, Standl.   see Neea amplifolia
 Neea ovalifolia, Spruce ex J.A.Schmidt
 Neea parimensis, Steyerm.
 Neea parviflora, Poepp. & Endl.
 Neea parvifolia, Lundell   see Neea psychotrioides
 Neea pendulina, Heimerl
 Neea pittieri, Standl.
 Neea popenoei, P.H. Allen   see Neea psychotrioides
 Neea psychotrioides, Donn. Sm.
 Neea pycnantha, Standl.   see Neea psychotrioides
 Neea robusta, Steyerm.
 Neea schwackeana, Heimerl
 Neea sebastianii, Steyerm.
 Neea sphaerantha, Standl.   see Neea psychotrioides
 Neea spruceana, Heimerl
 Neea subglabrata, Steyerm.
 Neea subpubescens, Heimerl
 Neea tenuis, Standl.
 Neea tepuiensis, Steyerm.
 Neea theifera, Oerst is an unresolved name
 Neea tristis, Heimerl
 Neea urophylla, Standl.    see Neea amplifolia
 Neea verticillata, Ruiz & Pav.
 Neea virens, Poepp. ex Heimerl
 Neea weberbaueri, Heimerl   see Neea spruceana
 Neea williamsii, Standl.
 Neea xanthina, Standl.   see Neea psychotrioides

 Torrubia panamensis, Standl.    see Neea delicatula

References

External links
Plant Illustrations -- Neea

 
Caryophyllales genera
Taxonomy articles created by Polbot
Plants described in 1794
Flora of Mexico
Flora of Central America
Flora of the Caribbean
Flora of northern South America
Flora of western South America
Flora of Brazil
Flora of Paraguay